And Soon the Darkness is a 1970 British thriller film directed by Robert Fuest and starring Pamela Franklin, Michele Dotrice and Sandor Elès. The plot follows two British nurses on a cycling holiday in rural France; during their trip, one of them vanishes, and the other struggles to search for her in a rural community.

It was the first movie made under Bryan Forbes at EMI Elstree to be released (Hoffman had been produced first but was released later).

Plot
Jane and Cathy are two young nurses from Nottingham who are taking a cycling holiday through rural France. While having lunch at a busy restaurant, Cathy notices a handsome man drinking alone at an adjacent table. Shortly after the women depart, the man also leaves the cafe on a Lambretta scooter. On a country road surrounded by farmland, the women are passed by the man on his scooter. Several minutes later, the women pass by him as he rests by a cemetery.

As the women pass through a small village, they encounter the man again. Cathy, who has grown tired of cycling, decides she wants to sunbathe, and stops at a wooded area along the road. Jane agrees to rest momentarily, but the two women get into an argument over the trip itinerary, and Jane decides to continue on alone. Jane soon arrives at a rural roadside cafe, where the proprietor, Madame Lassal, warns her that the area is dangerous and that she should not be travelling alone. Meanwhile, Cathy, still sunbathing, becomes unnerved and senses she is being watched. Upon trying to leave, she finds that someone has destroyed the wheel of her bicycle. Moments later, she is confronted by an unseen assailant.

Feeling guilty over leaving Cathy behind, Jane returns to the spot where she was sunbathing. She finds no sign of Cathy, apart from her camera lying in the grass. Moments later, the man the women saw earlier at the restaurant stops along the road on his scooter. He introduces himself as Paul, and Jane explains to him that she is looking for Cathy. Paul offers Jane a ride back to the village, where she believes Cathy may have gone. While questioning locals in town, Jane learns of an unsolved rape and murder of a young woman that occurred in the town the year before. Meanwhile, Paul rides into the woods on his scooter to search for Cathy.

Jane encounters a British schoolmistress in town who drives her part-way to meet the gendarme and report Cathy's disappearance. En route, the schoolmistress tells Jane the unsolved murder occurred in the same wooded area from which Cathy vanished. Unable to locate the gendarme, Jane returns to the roadside cafe and asks Madam Lassal for help, but she again urges Jane to leave the area. Jane again encounters Paul, who reveals he is a private investigator who researched the case of the murdered woman. The two get into an argument when Jane discovers Paul has taken the film from Cathy's camera as evidence. Convinced he has hurt Cathy, Jane parts ways with him.

Running through the town on foot, Jane finally locates the residence of the gendarme, and explains what has occurred. The gendarme goes to investigate the scene, leaving Jane alone at his residence. Paul arrives at the house, but Jane refuses to open the door. When he breaks into the gendarme's home, Jane flees into the woods, where she stumbles upon an abandoned trailer park. While hiding in a camper, Jane finds Cathy's corpse. Paul manages to corner Jane in the woods, but she beats him in the face with a rock. At the edge of the abandoned trailer park, Jane finds the gendarme. As she embraces him, the gendarme begins to fondle her sexually. He begins to attack her, revealing himself to be the perpetrator. Jane attempts to fend him off, and is rescued by an injured Paul, who hits the gendarme with a large branch.

Cast
Pamela Franklin as Jane
Michele Dotrice as Cathy
Sandor Elès as Paul
John Nettleton as Gendarme
Clare Kelly as Schoolmistress
Hana Maria Pravda as Madame Lassal
John Franklyn as Old Man
Claude Bertrand as Lassal
Jean Carmet as Reiner
André Maranne as Radio DJ (Uncredited)

Background and production
One of the first films made under Bryan Forbes at EMI Elstree,  it was shot entirely in France. The film was directed by Robert Fuest, and made by the same production team as The Avengers television series. The screenplay was written by Brian Clemens and Terry Nation, both of whom had contributed to The Avengers, as well as to several ITC crime series. It was also scored by Avengers theme composer Laurie Johnson.

Clemens was involved in producing and storyboarding the film, and said it inspired him to try directing. He later commented, "My business partner (Albert Fennell) said 'You should have directed it' and suddenly I thought 'Yeah, perhaps I should have done'. I knew I could have directed it better." He wrote what became See No Evil for Forbes at EMI; after Forbes left the company the film was made at Columbia. Clemens eventually turned director with Captain Kronos, Vampire Hunter.

Release

Reception
The film did moderately well at the box-office on both sides of the Atlantic, but was not a big success.

In 1971, The New York Times reviewer stated: "Until the disappearance and for a while afterward everything goes very well toward building tension with understated effects. But eventually, by mere repetition, the understated effects begin to look like poverty of the imagination. Then terror becomes a function of gratuitous camera technique, and danger the product of dishonest characterization." Halliwell's Film Guide comments: "Slow, overstretched, often risible  suspender ... long on red herrings and short on humour, but with some pretension to style." Time Out described it as an "[u]nappealing women-in-peril thriller" which is "[p]redictable, implausible, and not a little nasty." In contrast, the film was listed seventh in the Cinefantastiques list of the top ten sci-fi/horror films of the 1970s. Frederick S. Clarke, the magazine's editor, called it "a lady-in-distress picture that for suspense tops anything of its kind."

DVD release
The film was released as a DVD in the US with an audio commentary by Fuest and Clemens, and released in the UK as a region 2 DVD at the end of January 2008.

Remake
An American remake of the film was released in 2010.

References

External links 
 
 
 And Soon the Darkness at Britmovie.

1970 films
British thriller films
1970s psychological thriller films
Films shot at Associated British Studios
Films directed by Robert Fuest
Films about missing people
Films scored by Laurie Johnson
Films set in France
Films with screenplays by Terry Nation
EMI Films films
1970s English-language films
1970s British films